Mehdi Kiani (born 10 January 1987 in Nahavand) is an Iranian football midfielder who currently plays for Tractor in the Persian Gulf Pro League.

Club career
He started his professional career with Tractor in summer 2008. He played seven seasons and 171 games before leaving the club and signing for fellow Tabrizi club Gostaresh Foolad.

Club career statistics

 Assist goals

Honours

Club
Tractor
Iran Pro League : 2011–12 Runner up , 2012–13 Runner up , 2014–15 Runner up
Azadegan League (1) : 2008–09
Hazfi Cup (1) : 2013–14

Individual
Persian Gulf Pro League Best  Midfielder of the Year : 2018–19

References

External links

 

1987 births
Living people
Iranian footballers
Association football midfielders
Tractor S.C. players
People from Nahavand
Gostaresh Foulad F.C. players
Persian Gulf Pro League players
Azadegan League players